The Queen Album is a solo cover album of the band Queen by Elaine Paige. It was released in 1988 and peaked at No. 51 in the UK in November 1988. This is the only album from Paige to be released on Siren Records and distributed by Virgin Records. The album was re-issued with different artwork on CD in 1990 on Virgin VIP by Virgin Records.

Background 
This is the only Paige album compiled of songs written and recorded by one composer or group. The album is a covers album of ten songs previously recorded by the rock group Queen, a favourite of Paige. The selected songs are a combination of hits and lesser-known album tracks, taken from Queen's entire back catalogue. The songs have been altered and re-styled for this recording, with classical arrangements making orchestral renditions of the original rock songs.

Production 
The Queen Album is the first of a number of Paige's albums produced by Mike Moran. They would later work together on Piaf (1994) and Essential Musicals (2006), as well as a number of tracks for Centre Stage: The Very Best of Elaine Paige (2004).

The closing track, "Radio Ga Ga", which features original BBC radio fragments, taken from the BBC sound archives, was released as a single. The 3" CD single release included a bonus track, "Play the Game", which was not included on the album.

Track listing

Personnel

Musicians 
 Elaine Paige - vocals
 The New Philharmonic Orchestra
 Richard Studt, Pat Halling - orchestra leaders
 Mike Moran - keyboards
 Trevor Barry - bass guitar
 Ray Russell - guitar
 Brett Morgan - drums
 Skaila Kanga - harp
 Miriam Stockley, Mae McKenna, Phil Nicholl, Leroy Osbourne, Mick Mullens - backing vocals

Production
 Producer - Mike Moran
 Recording Engineers - Richard 'Call Me Lucky' Dodd, Stuart Bruce
 Assistant Engineers - Marsten Bailey, Martin Edwards, Alex Bardock

Certifications and sales

References

1988 albums
Elaine Paige albums
Queen (band) tribute albums
Virgin Records albums